The Lowestoffe class were a class of two 28-gun sixth-rate frigates of the Royal Navy. They served during the Seven Years' War, with  surviving to see action in the American War of Independence and the French Revolutionary Wars.

They were designed by Sir Thomas Slade, based on the prototype 28-gun frigate  (launched in 1748), "with such alterations as may tend to the better stowing of men and carrying for guns". These alterations involved raising the headroom between decks. They were originally ordered as 24-gun ships with 160 men, but re-rated while under construction to 28 guns with the addition of 3-pounder guns on the quarterdeck and with their complement being raised to 180 men.

Ships in class 
HMS Lowestoffe
 Ordered: 20 May 1755
 Builder:  John Greaves, Limehouse.
 Laid Down:  June 1755
 Launched:  17 May 1756
 Completed:  8 June 1756 at Deptford Dockyard.
 Fate:  Wrecked at Pointe-aux-Trembles, Canada on 19 May 1760.
HMS Tartar
 Ordered: 12 June 1755
 Builder:  John Randall, Rotherhithe.
 Laid Down:  4 July 1755
 Launched:  3 April 1756
 Completed:  2 May 1756 at Deptford Dockyard.
 Fate:  Wrecked at Puerto Plata, then burnt there 1 April 1797.

References 

 David Lyon, The Sailing Navy List, Brasseys Publications, London 1993.
 Rif Winfield, British Warships in the Age of Sail, 1714 to 1792, Seaforth Publishing, London 2007.  

Frigate classes